The Demos is the second studio album by Canadian country artist Jess Moskaluke. It was released on February 19, 2021, through MDM Recordings. It includes the number-one Canada Country hit "Country Girls", as well as "Halfway Home", "Mapdot", "Leave Each Other Alone", and "Nothin' I Don't Love About You".

Background
Before the onset of the COVID-19 pandemic, Moskaluke had not intended to release an album for some time, intending to work on singles instead. After the institution of travel restrictions, she could not travel from her home in Saskatchewan to Nashville, Tennessee to record new music with producer Corey Crowder. Rather than writing new songs, Moskaluke decided to delve into her back catalogue of songs she had never recorded on past albums. She worked with Crowder to virtually turn the demos of these songs into a fully-produced record.

Critical reception
The Demos received generally positive reviews. Joshua Murray of The Reviews Are In called the album a "good listen" that "[doesn't] seem to go by too quickly or too slowly". Kim Hughes of Parton and Pearl noted Moskaluke's "mighty, indefatigable" voice. Hannah Rastrick of Complete Country said that the "songs cover every stage of love that we can all relate to" and referred to Moskaluke's vocals as "spot on".

Track listing

Charts

Singles

Release history

References

External links
 

2021 albums
Jess Moskaluke albums
MDM Recordings albums
Universal Music Canada albums